Fausto Rossi (born 2 January 1954 in Sacile, Province of Pordenone) is an Italian singer-songwriter.

Discography

Album

As Faust'O

 1978 – Suicidio (Record label: Ascolto, ASC 20041)
 1979 – Poco zucchero (Ascolto, ASC 20127)
 1980 – J'accuse, amore mio (Ascolto, ASC 20232)
 1982 – Out now(Self Made)
 1983 – Faust'O (Ricordi)
 1985 – Love story (Target Music)

As Fausto Rossi

 1992 – Cambiano le cose (Target Music)
 1995 – L'erba (Target Music)
 1996 – Lost and found (Target Music)
 1997 – Exit (Target Music)
 2009 – Becoming Visible (Interbeat Records)
 2010 – Below the Line (Interbeat Records)
 2012 – Blank times (Interbeat Records)

External links
Official Site
Official Blog
Fan club
Target Music

1954 births
Living people
People from Sacile
Italian singer-songwriters
Italian new wave musicians